La Peur, also known under the title Vertige d'un soir is a 1936 French film by Russian director Viktor Tourjansky. The film is based on Joseph Kessel's adaptation of the story Fear by Stefan Zweig.

See also
Angst (1928)
Fear (1954)

References

External links

1936 films
1936 drama films
French drama films
1930s French-language films
Films directed by Victor Tourjansky
Films based on works by Stefan Zweig
French black-and-white films
1930s French films